Cymbidium aloifolium, the aloe-leafed cymbidium, is a species of orchid found in Asia, especially China and southeast Asia from Burma to Sumatra.  It can be found growing between rocks or on another plant.  The word cymbidium comes from the Greek  meaning "hole, cavity" and the Latin specific name is just a translation of the English "aloe-leafed".

References

aloifolium
Plants described in 1753
Taxa named by Carl Linnaeus